Futaleufú, a Mapudungun word meaning "Big River", may refer to:

Futaleufú River
Futaleufú Department, Argentina
Futaleufú, Chile
Futaleufú National Reserve